Duo 2 is an album by pianist Kenny Drew  and bassist Niels-Henning Ørsted Pedersen recorded in 1974 and released on the SteepleChase label.

Reception
The Allmusic review awarded the album 4 stars stating "The pianist's style was largely unchanged from the 1950s except that he had grown a bit as a player and was open to some more modern chord voicings. The music on this encounter with the virtuosic bassist Niels Pederson should easily appeal to Kenny Drew's fans".

Track listing
 "Jeg Gik Mig Over Sø Og Land" (Traditional) - 3:52   
 "Largo" (Kenny Drew) - 4:03   
 "My Little Suede Shoes" (Charlie Parker) - 4:30   
 "Trubbel" (Olle Adolphson) - 2:50   
 "Bluesology" (Milt Jackson ) - 6:18   
 "That's All" (Bob Haymes) - 2:29 Bonus track on CD  
 "You Don't Know What Love Is" (Gene DePaul, Don Raye) - 5:14 Bonus track on CD   
 "Viking's Blues" (Niels-Henning Ørsted Pedersen) - 6:37   
 "A Child Is Born" (Thad Jones) - 4:18   
 "It Might as Well Be Spring" (Oscar Hammerstein II, Richard Rodgers) - 5:45   
 "My Shining Hour" (Harold Arlen, Johnny Mercer) - 5:37

Personnel
Kenny Drew - piano
Niels-Henning Ørsted Pedersen - bass

References

Kenny Drew albums
Niels-Henning Ørsted Pedersen albums
1974 albums
SteepleChase Records albums